Bruna (minor planet designation: 290 Bruna) is a main belt asteroid that was discovered on 20 March 1890 by Johann Palisa, an Austrian astronomer at the Vienna Observatory.

Photometric observations of this asteroid at the Organ Mesa Observatory in Las Cruces, New Mexico, during 2008 gave a light curve with a period of 13.807 ± 0.001 hours and a brightness variation of 0.54 ± 0.04 in magnitude. Changes in the brightness of the minimum with phase angle is attributed to changes in the shadows across surface features.

It was named by Hofrath August Bielsa for Brünn, now Brno, Czech Republic, Bielsa's home town.

References

External links
 
 

Phocaea asteroids
Bruna
Bruna
18900320